The 2007 Asian Fencing Championships were held in Nantong, China from 22 August to 27 August 2007.

Medal summary

Men

Women

Medal table

References

FIE Archive Results

External links
Official website

Asian Championship
F
Asian Fencing Championships
International fencing competitions hosted by Thailand